Bujan (also Romanized as Būjān and Boojan) is a village in Korzan Rud Rural District, in the Central District of Tuyserkan County, Hamadan Province, Iran. At the 2006 census, its population was 394, in 118 families.

References 

Populated places in Tuyserkan County